No Rules: Get Phat is an action video game developed by Flying Tiger Development and published by TDK Mediactive for the Game Boy Advance. It was released on November 15, 2001 in North America and on November 30, 2001 in Europe.

Plot
This game puts players in this position of the main character One-eye Jack; a cereal loving, recreation addict, student, and young person that must defeat a sadistic intergalactic organized crime gang of alien invaders called the "punkazzes" from planet “punkazz” launching an alien invasion, alien conspiracy, UFO conspiracy, abduction phenomenon, terror attack, escape with this town's resources, scare and injure citizens, learn and destroy modern era leisure, and eliminate town's authority. They’ve invaded this town him and his friend's are from, snow mountains, subway station, cereal manufacturing plant, and there’s these invader's mothership.

There's five levels, and therefore five of these boss levels. And these alien invaders also hold Jack’s friends hostage. And after defeating this final boss which is the leader and gang boss of these alien invaders. Plus, after winning this final fight, Jack rescues these friends and they show him how grateful they are for saving them and the entire town from this invasion and insurgency.

Reception
IGN's Craig Harris gave the game a negative review, praising the game's artistic style, but heavily criticizing the gameplay and forced hipness.

References

2001 video games
Game Boy Advance games
Game Boy Advance-only games
Platform games
Side-scrolling video games
Video games developed in the United States
TDK Mediactive games
Single-player video games
Flying Tiger Entertainment games